Gomhoriat Shebin Sporting Club, is an Egyptian sports club based in Shebin El Koum, El Monufia, Egypt. The club is mainly known for its football team, which currently plays in the Egyptian Second Division, the second-highest league in the Egyptian football league system.

Egyptian Second Division
Football clubs in Egypt